Vivekananda Institute of Medical Sciences (VIMS)  is a medical institution and hospital on Sarat Bose Road, Kolkata, which functions under the Ramakrishna Math and Ramakrishna Mission. It started in July 1932 as Shishumangal Pratishthan, a maternity and child welfare clinic by Swami Dayanand, a disciple of Sarada Devi. 

Swami Dayananda (born Vimal) was younger brother of Swami Madhavananda, the ninth President of the Ramakrishna Math and Ramakrishna Mission (1962–1965). In 1956, the clinic paved way for the present hospital. Today the institution runs a 600-bed general hospital, Ma Sarada School of Nursing, Vivekananda Institute of Medical Sciences, besides mobile health units and community health services for rural areas.

References

External links
 Ramakrishna Mission Seva Pratishthan, Official website

West Bengal University of Health Sciences
Ramakrishna Mission
Hospitals in Kolkata
Organisations based in Kolkata
Education in Kolkata
Medical colleges in West Bengal
Health charities in India
Nursing schools in India
1932 establishments in India